San Yun (1905 – 1974) was the prime minister of Cambodia from 1956 to 1957. He was Minister of Finance in 1957.

References 

1905 births
1974 deaths
20th-century Cambodian politicians 
Prime Ministers of Cambodia
Finance ministers of Cambodia
People from Pursat province 
Sangkum politicians